Parkersburg Catholic High School is a private, Roman Catholic high school in Parkersburg, West Virginia.  It is part of the Roman Catholic Diocese of Wheeling-Charleston.

Parkersburg Catholic was opened in 1950, located at the corner of 9th and Juliana Sts.  It was moved to a new site on Fairview Ave. in 1958.  It was the first Catholic high school in the area.  Originally known as St. Francis Xavier High School, the name was changed to its present name in 1954.  It began with its highest level as the 9th Grade, then expanded each year thereafter. It now hosts grades 7-12, with 80 students enrolled on average.

Hail to alma mater hail,
Never will our loyalties fail,
Hardships and studies,
Laughter and buddies,
Make us one,
Never will the memories die,
Through the years of days by,
We will be true forever,
To Parkersburg Catholic High.

References

External links
 School Website
 School History

Roman Catholic Diocese of Wheeling-Charleston
Private middle schools in West Virginia
Catholic secondary schools in West Virginia
Schools in Wood County, West Virginia
Educational institutions established in 1958
1958 establishments in West Virginia